The Savannah-Chatham Metropolitan Police Department (SCMPD) was the primary law enforcement agency for the city of Savannah, Georgia, United States, as well as Chatham County, Georgia. It was founded in 2005 when the Savannah Police Department and the Chatham County Police Department merged.

In June 2017, the Savannah-Chatham Metro Police Department split after 12 years for being unable to resolve issues of poor response times, the legality of the Mayor of Savannah naming the police chief, and other issues. Now the city is policed by the Savannah Police Department and the unincorporated parts of Chatham County (starting on Feb 1, 2018) by the newly formed Chatham County Police Department.  The Chatham County Sheriff's Department will aid the County Police until they are fully staffed. 

The new chief of the Chatham County Police Department is Jeffrey M. Hadley. On August 27, 2018, Roy W. Minter, Jr. became the Chief of Police of the Savannah Police Department.

References

External links
 Official Website

2005 establishments in Georgia (U.S. state)
Chatham County, Georgia
County police departments of Georgia (U.S. state)
Government agencies established in 2005